Heart, Soul & a Voice is the second English-language album by Cuban American singer Jon Secada, released in 1994 on the SBK Records label. It contains the singles "Take Me", "If You Go", and "Mental Picture". All of the tracks except "Don't Be Silly" also appear as Spanish language versions on the corresponding Spanish album Si Te Vas.

Track listing
"Whipped" – 4:31 (Jon Secada, Tom McWilliams)
"Take Me" – 5:00 (Secada, Lawrence Dermer)
"If You Go" – 4:33 (Secada, Miguel A. Morejon)
"Good Feelings" – 4:01 (Secada, Dermer)
"Where Do I Go from You?" – 4:25 (Diane Warren)
"Fat Chance" – 4:09 (Secada, McWilliams)
"Mental Picture" – 4:19 (Secada, Morejon)
"Stay" – 4:05 (Secada, Dermer)
"La, La, La" – 3:44 (Secada, Morejon)
"Don't Be Silly" – 4:07 (Secada, Scott Shapiro)
"Eyes of a Fool" – 4:07 (Secada, Morejon, Warren)
"Si Te Vas (If You Go)" – 4:38 (Secada, Morejon, Rebecca Fajardo)
"Tuyo (Take Me)" – 4:19 (Secada, Dermer, G. Estefan, E. Estefan, Rube Bloom)

Charts

Sales and certifications

References

1994 albums
Jon Secada albums
SBK Records albums